Prosymna is a village located in the municipal unit of Mykines, Argolis, Greece. Frank Klopas was born here. The village is a historical Arvanite settlement.

References

Populated places in Argolis
Arvanite settlements